Legends of Hockey is a Canadian ten-part/ten-hour mini-series released in 2001 profiling the history of ice hockey.

The Legends of Hockey features the following people:

Series one

Episode One
 Dan Bain
 Hobey Baker
 Frank Fredrickson
 Ambrose O'Brien
 Frank Patrick
 Lester Patrick
 Art Ross
 Lord Stanley
 Cyclone Taylor
 Georges Vezina

Episode Two
 Bobby Bauer
 King Clancy
 Woody Dumart
 Foster Hewitt
 Red Horner
 Busher Jackson
 Howie Morenz
 Joe Primeau
 Milt Schmidt
 Eddie Shore
 Conn Smythe
 Nels Stewart

Episode Three
 Andy Bathgate
 Bernie "Boom Boom" Geoffrion
 Gordie Howe
 Ted "Teeder" Kennedy
 Ted Lindsay
 Jacques Plante
 Chuck Rayner
 Henri Richard
 Maurice "The Rocket" Richard

Episode Four
 Jean Beliveau
 Johnny Bower
 Johnny Bucyk
 Gerry Cheevers
 Bobby Hull
 Red Kelly
 Frank Mahovlich
 Stan Mikita
 Bobby Orr

Episode Five
 Bobby Clarke
 Marcel Dionne
 Guy Lafleur
 Lanny McDonald
 Brad Park
 Gilbert Perreault
 Larry Robinson
 Darryl Sittler
 Vladislav Tretiak

Series two

Episode One
 Glenn Hall
 Dave Keon
 Dickie Moore
 Marcel Pronovost
 Terry Sawchuk
 Norm Ullman
 Gump Worsley

Episode Two
 Yvan Cournoyer
 Alex Delvecchio
 Ken Dryden
 Emile Francis
 Eddie Giacomin
 Rod Gilbert
 Tim Horton

Episode Three
 Mike Bossy
 Mario Lemieux
 Denis Potvin
 Billy Smith
 Bryan Trottier

Episode Four
 Scotty Bowman
 Michel Goulet
 Wayne Gretzky
 Glen Sather
 Peter Šťastný

Episode Five
 Bill Barber
 Phil Esposito
 Tony Esposito
 Bob Gainey
 Guy Lapointe
 Serge Savard
 Steve Shutt

Recognition
The series has been awarded and nominated multiple times. It was the winner of the Gemini Award for Best Sports Program or Series in 2000 and a Gemini nomination for Best Direction in a Documentary Series and winner of two CAN PRO awards for Best Mini-feature (telecast outside daily newscast) and Best Sports Series. It also received honourable mention Banff Film Festival.

External links
 

2001 Canadian television series debuts
2000s Canadian documentary television series
2000s Canadian sports television series
A-Channel original programming
2000s Canadian television miniseries